Chi-Chi or variations thereof may refer to:

Geography
Chichi (village) or Çiçi, in the Quba Rayon of Azerbaijan
Chi-chi, Nantou, a township in Taiwan

People
Chi Chi Gonzalez (born 1992), American baseball pitcher
Chi-Chi Olivo (1928–1977), Major League Baseball pitcher
Rafael Quintero (1940–2006), American CIA operative
Chi-Chi Rodríguez (born 1935), Puerto Rican golfer
Chi Chi DeVayne, stage name of American drag queen Zavion Michael Davenport (1985–2020)
Chi Chi LaRue, a drag queen persona of director of gay and bisexual pornography Larry David Paciotti (born 1959)
Chi Chi (record producer), Nigerian-American record producer and songwriter Chidi Osondu
Chi Chi, a ring name of American professional wrestler Allan Funk (born 1971)
Chi Chi, nickname of Bollywood actor Govinda (born 1963)

Characters
Chi-Chi (Dragon Ball), Chichi or Chi Chi, a character in Dragon Ball media
Chi Chi, a character in the Scarface universe

Music
"Chi Chi" (Azealia Banks song), 2017
"Chi Chi" (Trey Songz song), 2019

Other uses
Chi-Chi's, an international Tex-Mex restaurant chain
Chi Chi (giant panda) (1957–1972), star attraction at London Zoo from 1958 to 1972
Chi Chi, a variant of the piña colada cocktail

See also
Chee-Chee (disambiguation)
Chicha, a Southern and Central American drink
Chi chi man, an offensive slang term in Jamaican and Caribbean English referring to gay men
Shishi (disambiguation)

Lists of people by nickname